The Bothy Band were an Irish traditional band active during the mid 1970s. They quickly gained a reputation as one of the most influential bands playing Irish traditional music. Their enthusiasm and musical virtuosity had a significant influence on the Irish traditional music movement that continued well after they disbanded in 1979.

History

Formation
The Bothy Band was formed in 1975 by bouzouki player Dónal Lunny, after he left the group Planxty to form his own record company, Mulligan. Lunny invited uilleann piper Paddy Keenan, flute and whistle player Matt Molloy, fiddler Paddy Glackin, and accordion player Tony MacMahon to get involved in an early project for the new label. This group of players was soon joined by a brother and sister who played in the Irish traditional group Skara Brae: Mícheál Ó Domhnaill on acoustic guitar and Tríona Ní Dhomhnaill on clavinet and vocals. Originally called Seachtar (Irish for seven), the group was renamed by Mícheál Ó Domhnaill after Tony MacMahon left the group to work as a producer for BBC. The Bothy Band made its debut on 2 February 1975 at Trinity College, Dublin.

Three studio album career
In 1975, the Bothy Band released their eponymous first album on Mulligan Records (in Ireland; Green Linnet Records in US; Polydor Records in UK), which received critical acclaim and established their reputation as a significant musical force in Irish traditional music. In 1976, they released their second album, Old Hag You Have Killed Me, which also received critical praise and expanded their following. In 1977, they recorded what would be their last studio album, Out of the Wind – Into the Sun. In 1979, the Bothy Band released a live album, After Hours (Live in Paris).

During their four years together, the Bothy Band featured a variety of fiddlers. Original fiddler Glackin was replaced by Donegal fiddler Tommy Peoples on the band's début album. Peoples in turn was replaced by Sligo-influenced fiddler Kevin Burke on the second release.

After the Bothy Band break-up
After the group disbanded in 1979, the members continued to play influential musical roles in the Irish traditional music movement. Lunny returned to Planxty along with Molloy, and then later helped form the Celtic rock band Moving Hearts. He continued working as a record producer, and later joined Andy Irvine to form the group Mozaik, releasing two albums in 2004 and 2007. After recording two albums with Planxty, Molloy joined The Chieftains. After several solo projects with Ó Domhnaill, Burke founded Patrick Street with Irvine and Jackie Daly (formerly of De Dannan). Ó Domhnaill and Ní Dhomhnaill went on to form Relativity and Nightnoise.

In 1994, previously unreleased concert recordings from the 1970s were released as BBC Radio One – The Bothy Band Live in Concert. The music had been recorded in two different locations on different dates – 15 July 1976, at the BBC's Paris Theatre in London, and 24 July 1978, at the National Theatre, Kilburn.

2007 tribute concert
Following the death of Mícheál Ó Domhnaill in July 2006, the surviving members of the Bothy Band came together at the tribute concert "Ómós- A Gig for Mícheál", held on 24 May 2007 at Vicar Street in Dublin. All proceeds from the concert went to the Irish Traditional Music Archive.

Discography
 The Bothy Band (1975) Track listing at irishtune.info
 Old Hag You Have Killed Me (1976) Track listing of 1982 reissue at irishtune.info
 Out of the Wind – Into the Sun (1977) Track listing of 1985 reissue at irishtune.info
 After Hours (Live in Paris) (1979) Track listing of 1984 reissue at irishtune.info
 The Best of the Bothy Band (1980) Track listing of 1988 reissue at irishtune.info
 The Bothy Band Live in Concert (1994) Track listing at irishtune.info

See also
 Bothy band

References

1975 establishments in Ireland
1978 disestablishments in Ireland
Celtic music groups
Irish folk musical groups
Musical groups established in 1975
Musical groups disestablished in 1978